The Santa Fe Trail is a 1923 American silent Western film serial directed by Ashton Dearholt and Robert Dillon, produced by Ben F. Wilson and released by Arrow Film Corporation. The film is considered to be lost.

Plot summary

Cast
 Jack Perrin as Kit Carson
 Neva Gerber
 Jim Welch (as James Welch)
 Elias Bullock
 Wilbur McGaugh
 Clark B. Coffey
 Joe De La Cruz
 Maria Laredo
 Ned Jarvis

See also
 List of film serials
 List of film serials by studio
 List of lost films

References

External links
 

1923 films
1923 Western (genre) films
1923 lost films
1920s independent films
American silent serial films
American black-and-white films
American independent films
Films directed by Ashton Dearholt
Films directed by Robert A. Dillon
Lost Western (genre) films
Lost American films
Santa Fe Trail
Arrow Film Corporation films
Silent American Western (genre) films
1920s American films